Crosnierius is a genus of crabs in the family Xanthidae, containing the following species:

 Crosnierius carinatus Serene & Vadon, 1981
 Crosnierius gracilipes Ng & Chen, 2005

References

Xanthoidea